State Highway 51 (SH-51) is a state highway in southwestern Idaho from Mountain Home south to the Nevada border, where it continues as State Route 225 to Elko. It is the major north–south road in Owyhee County.

As currently configured in the state's official milepoint log, SH-51 terminates at the Business Loop 84 intersection with American Legion Boulevard, and is not otherwise officially concurrent/overlaid with BL-84 (where the signs at I-84's Exits 90 and 95 say "To SH-51/To SH-67") or the former section of US-20 that follows American Legion Boulevard to Interstate 84/U.S. Route 20 east at Exit 95.  As of February 2015, some map products such as Google Maps still show SH-51's former overlay with American Legion Boulevard.

Route description

SH-51's northern terminus is in the city of Mountain Home in Elmore County. After turning south from Airbase Rd. and the intersection with SH-67, the road crosses the Snake River into Owyhee County and passes through the towns of Bruneau, Grasmere, and Riddle.  About  from the state border it enters the Duck Valley Indian Reservation.

As the road crosses into Nevada it becomes State Route 225. After another  through Elko County, SR 225 connects with Interstate 80 in Elko.

History
The basic route of today's SH-51 was in place as early as the 1930s, mostly as an all-weather gravel road from Mountain Home until it reached the northern boundary of the Duck Valley Indian Reservation, and as an unimproved road on through to the Nevada border and then-NV Route 11 as of the 1937 map.

Major intersections

Elevation
Elevation on the highway ranges from a low of 2461 feet (750 m) above sea level at the Snake River crossing,to a high of 5400 feet (1646 m) at the Nevada border.

References

051
Transportation in Owyhee County, Idaho
Transportation in Elmore County, Idaho